In the UK, an unseen examination is an essay test in school or college, where the student does not know what questions are going to be asked. The student is required to answer questions based upon what they have learned over the course of their academic study.

School examinations